Canal Winchester is a public high school located in Canal Winchester, Ohio. The town is located 25 minutes South-East of downtown Columbus and is about 30 minutes away from historic Lancaster. It is the only high school in the Canal Winchester School District.

Ohio High School Athletic Association State Championships

 Girls Volleyball - 1986

Eastland-Fairfield Career & Technical School

Notable alumni
 Sam Loucks, basketball player in the NBL during the 1930s
 Byron Mullens, basketball player in the NBA during the 2010s

References

External links
District Website

High schools in Franklin County, Ohio
Public high schools in Ohio